Norway's criminal justice system focuses on the principles of restorative justice and the rehabilitation of prisoners. Correctional facilities in Norway focus on maintaining custody of the offender and attempting to make them functioning members of society. Norway's laws forbid the use of torture and other cruel, inhuman, or degrading treatment as punishment. Prison conditions typically meet international standards, and the government permits visits by human rights observers. The system is considered to be transparent, and prisoners are represented by an ombudsman, an official appointed to investigate individuals’ complaints against public authority.

Norway has one of the lowest recidivism rates in the world; in 2016, only 20% of inmates re-offended within 5 years. The country also has one of the lowest overall crime rates on Earth. Norway's prison system houses approximately three thousand offenders.

Norway's prison system is renowned as one of the most effective and humane in the world. Norway does not instate capital punishment or life imprisonment. The maximum custodial sentence is 21 years (30 for crimes against humanity and only life imprisonment for military crimes); however, at the end of the initial prison term the courts have the power to add five-year increments to the prisoner’s sentence every five years, indefinitely, if it is determined the prisoner is not rehabilitated.

History 
Before the introduction of the rehabilitative justice system, Norway had a punitive justice system. By 1968, Norwegians had become dissatisfied with the harsh living conditions of the correctional system, and the Norwegian Association for Criminal Reform (KROM) was formed. KROM altered the penal system, which largely depended on the medical treatment of offenders; at that time, prisoners were being treated medically, and, depending on the success of the treatment, were incarcerated for an appropriate term. KROM's first substantive change to Norwegian penology occurred in 1970, with the abolition of forced labor. In 1975, juvenile delinquency centers were abolished. Reforms in the early 1990s focused much more on rehabilitation.

Prison system

Penalties in society 
Norway's criminal justice protocol is often referred to as the “Norwegian model”, though Norway prefers to use "alternative penalties" or “penalties in society”. "Penalties in prison" is also used.

"Penalties in society" means the offender will serve at least some of their time out of jail and will have to meet with an official a specified number of times as ordered by the court. In return, an individual can stay out of prison if they follow the court's rules. In most cases, criminals retain their current employment, or the court orders employment, and they may remain with their families and continue their normal life. Penalties in society are only imposed if there is no burden on the victims, their families, or society.

Community service is the most common penalty in society. It is measured in hours, and not days, months, or years. Approximately 2,500 people per year are sentenced to this form of punishment, and hours can range from 30 to 70. The average duration given is around 70 hours and should be completed in under a year. Community service is usually spent in social work. The individual spends their time in churches, schools, kindergartens, volunteer organizations, and social organizations.

Community service may include “change programs”, treatment, special conversations, and other programs. The correctional system has a right to add other conditions, like the prohibition of drug or alcohol use, outside of court orders. The correctional system will draw up an “implementation plan” under the guidelines of the court order. It can then add programs or conditions as it sees fit.

Electronic monitoring or electronic control is one of the most applied methods of penalties in society. An electronic ankle GPS tracker is issued to monitor the individual, though it can only be used in the last four months of probation or imprisonment, and the individual must be qualified to wear one.

Anti-doping programs are also included in correctional programs. These are court-ordered alternative programs for offenders who would otherwise be unconditionally imprisoned and are often imposed for driving under the influence of drugs, of for the use of illegal drugs. A drug program with judicial review is another alternative to unconditional imprisonment for drug and alcohol addicts. Crimes that can get the offender into this program are anything drug-related, including crimes to fund the addiction such as theft.

Penalty in prison 
 there were 43 prisons in Norway, five of which are strictly female, and all prisons are driven by the “import model”. In the import model, services are given to inmates just as to those not incarcerated (i.e. health services, education, access to a library, etc).

The longest sentence allowed in a Norwegian prison is 21 years, although a new penal code allows for a 30-year maximum sentence for crimes related to genocide, crimes against humanity, or war crimes. Additionally, sentences may be extended if a court rules that the inmate still poses a danger to society. The average sentence is about 8 months.

The intent of punishment in Norway is solely the restriction of liberty; no other rights are taken away. An offender in prison has the same rights as an ordinary citizen, including the right to vote. Prison authorities try to place offenders in the lowest security regime commensurate with the inmate's needs. Often, an individual will proceed towards release starting from a high security prison and moving to a lower security prison, then through a halfway house, and eventually released to the community.

When inmates are not at work, school, or in recreational activities, they are with correctional officers and/or in their cells. Inmates have their cells searched once a day, and are granted very few pre-approved personal items. Urine samples are collected, usually targeted at random within the population of inmates who have a known history of drug addiction.

There are three levels to the Norwegian prison system: High Security (closed prisons), Lower Security (open prisons) and Transitional Housing. The majority of prisons in Norway (60%) are closed; these facilities have walls and fences around the compound, and inmates are locked in and under the control of corrections officers. Open prisons only lock inmates in their cells, houses, or rooms at night; the prison campus is open, but inmates cannot leave. Calls are intercepted, but phone use is permitted. Open prisons encourage contact with the community through safe means (i.e. visitation, furlough, and other adaptations). Transitional housing is used when part of a sentence is completed; the prisoners remain in the prison system, but control over them is less strict. Transfer to transitional housing has to be pre-approved for the safety of the community. Transitional housing gradually returns inmates to society with social training and professional training. It sets up an inmate with a network to use once they are released back into society.

Prison officers
Those that work in Norwegian prisons are referred to as officers rather than guards. They have referred to themselves as role models, coaches and mentors to the prisoners. Training to become a prison officer has been cited as taking between two and three years of training. Training has been stated to involve "written exams in Norwegian and English ... physical fitness tests, law, ethics, criminology, English, reintegration and social work".

Prison population 
According to the World Prison Brief website, Norway has 2,932 people within its 58 different institutions as of 2020. Of those, 26% are remand prisoners or are in jail awaiting trial. Only about 0.1% of Norway's prisoners are juveniles, and about 6% are female. Approximately 26% of inmates are foreign-born.

Norway's prisons currently operate below their official capacity of 4,092 people. Between the years 2000 and 2016, the prison population increased, after which it decreased again. As of 2000, about 2,500 people were incarcerated in Norwegian prisons. By 2008, this had increased to about 3,400, and in 2016, the population was 3,850. In 2020 this dropped to 2,932 persons. This corresponded to a prison population rate in 2020 of 54 per 100,000 people.

See also

Norwegian Correctional Service

References

External links
 What makes Norway’s criminal justice system different to other countries?. The Local. Published 29 April 2021.
 How Norway Is Teaching America To Make Its Prisons More Humane. HuffPost. Published 22 August 2019.
 I toured prisons around the world — and the system that seems the most relaxed is also one that works. Business Insider. Published 19 July 2018.
 Is this a 'luxury prison'?. BBC News. 5 March 2018.
 Not the worst, but not Norway: US prisons vs. other models. HuffPost. Published 6 September 2017.
 Why Norway's prison system is so successful. TheJournal.ie. Published 13 December 2014.
 Bastoy: the Norwegian prison that works. The Guardian. Published 4 September 2013.
 The Norwegian prison where inmates are treated like people. The Guardian. Published 25 February 2013.

Norway articles needing expert attention
Norway
Penal system in Norway
Positive criminology